Jake Borthwick (29 July 1912 – 25 November 2008) was a Scotland international rugby union player.

Rugby Union career

Amateur career

He played for Stewart's College FP.

Provincial career

He represented Edinburgh District.

International career

References

1912 births
2008 deaths
Scottish rugby union players
Scotland international rugby union players
Rugby union players from Edinburgh
Stewart's College FP players
Edinburgh District (rugby union) players
Rugby union props